Betty L. Tianti (1929 – 1994) was an American trade union leader, the first woman in the United States to head a state labor federation, and the first state labor commissioner in Connecticut.

Biography
Tianti was a native of Killingly, Connecticut, graduated from Plainfield High School, and attended the University of Connecticut and the University of Massachusetts. She was elected president of the AFL–CIO union federation in Connecticut in 1985.

She started her career at the American Thread Company factory in Willimantic, Connecticut in 1956. She later became president of her local union, and from 1962 to 1970 was a union organizer in New England and in the Southern United States. She became the assistant director of the Textile Workers Union of America's Committee on Political Education (COPE), which was the union's political organizing and contributing arm.

From 1970 to 1974, she was an assistant agent for the Connecticut State Board of Labor Relations, and then served as COPE director for the state AFL-CIO. She became the labor federation's secretary- treasurer in 1979.

When the AFL-CIO's Connecticut  President John Driscoll retired in 1985, Tianti was elected to succeed him, making her the first woman in the United States to be elected as head of a state labor federation. In 1988, Governor William O'Neill appointed her as the state's first labor commissioner.

She was inducted into the Connecticut Women's Hall of Fame in 1994, and died of emphysema in the same year.

References

1929 births
1994 deaths
People from Killingly, Connecticut
AFL–CIO people
Deaths from emphysema